Gritsovsky is an urban locality (an urban-type settlement) in Venyovsky District of Tula Oblast, Russia, located  north of Venyov, the administrative center of the district, and  north of Novomoskovsk. As of the 2010 Census, its population was 6,192.

History
It was founded in 1954 as a village to house the miners at the Gryzlov lignite mine. In 1965, Gritsovsky was granted urban-type settlement status.

Gritsovsky reached its peak population of about 9,000 before the dissolution of the Soviet Union. Subsequently, the mines were privatized, followed by decreased demand for lignite, with the result that the last mine in the area closed in 2009.

A regional hospital was built in Gritsovsky in 1995, and in the 2000s a refrigerator factory (PZH, Podolsk) was built.

Administrative and municipal status
Within the framework of administrative divisions, the urban-type settlement of Gritsovsky is incorporated within Venyovsky District as Venyovsky Urban-Type Settlement. As a municipal division, Gritsovsky Urban-Type Settlement is incorporated within Venyovsky Municipal District as Gritsovsky Urban Settlement.

References

Notes

Sources



Urban-type settlements in Tula Oblast
Populated places established in 1954